Lee's Sandwiches International, Inc., is a Vietnamese-American fast food restaurant chain headquartered in San Jose, California, with locations in several states and in Taiwan. It is credited with popularizing Vietnamese sandwiches and iced coffee among mainstream American consumers and inspiring several other Vietnamese-owned bakery chains.

History

Lee's Sandwiches was founded by the  family, who owned a successful sugar refinery in An Giang Province in Vietnam before the Vietnam War and immigrated to the United States as boat people in July 1979. After having lived briefly in New Mexico and Monterey, California, they settled in San Jose, California, in 1980.

The following year, Chieu's brother Henry purchased his own food truck, and the two began a mobile catering distribution business. Founded in San Jose's Little Saigon, they named it Lee Bros. Foodservice, Inc., anglicizing their surname to "Lee". It grew to serve more than 500 food trucks by 1985, many of them owned by Vietnamese immigrants.

The truck's popularity prompted complaints from nearby restaurants. In June 1983, they opened a traditional Vietnamese sandwich shop named Lee's Sandwiches at the same street corner. In 1988, Lee's Sandwiches moved to a larger space near King and Tully roads in the Vietnamese section of East San Jose.

On August 8, 2001, Chieu and his son Minh opened the family's first American-style bakery-café in the Little Saigon of Westminster, California. It featured an expanded menu including deli sandwiches, coffee, and desserts, with the goal of attracting Vietnamese and non-Vietnamese customers alike. There was some disagreement among family members about the new direction. However, the new store was a success. Within a year, the chain opened seven more locations and expanded to many other cities in California. In 2005, Lee's Sandwiches became the first Vietnamese deli-cafe to franchise.

By 2006, Lee's had become one of the fastest-growing fast food chains in the western United States. A long line formed in anticipation of the grand opening of Lee's' first Houston location.

On August 8, 2008, Lee's opened a café in District 1, Ho Chi Minh City, as part of a joint venture with a South Korean company. In August 2015, it opened a location near the Taipei station in Taipei, Taiwan. , market research firm Sundale Research listed Lee's Sandwiches among the 12 largest bakery-café chains in the United States. On August 8, 2017, the  family opened a café named Lee's Coffee Roastery adjacent to a Lee's Sandwiches location in Westminster, California.

Many restaurants stopped dine-in service in March 2020 to combat the COVID-19 pandemic, with take-away and pickup service available.

Restaurants

, Lee's Sandwiches has 59 locations in the United States. They are located in cities with large Vietnamese American populations in Arizona, California, Nevada, Oklahoma, Oregon, Texas, and Virginia. One shop is located in front of the original location, next to San Jose City Hall. Lee's Sandwiches has locations in food courts at the Asian Garden Mall in Westminster, California, and the Cali Saigon Mall in Garland, Texas. With locations in Westminster Mall in Westminster and Eastport Plaza in Portland, Oregon, Lee's Sandwiches is one of the first Vietnamese businesses to enter mainstream malls and shopping centers.

Outside the U.S., Lee's Sandwiches has two locations in Taipei, Taiwan.

See also

 List of bakery cafés
 List of restaurant chains in the United States
 List of Vietnamese restaurants
 Phở Hòa, another Vietnamese restaurant chain that began in San Jose

References

External links

 
 Franchising website
 Lee's Coffee Roastery
 Lee Bros. Foodservice

Restaurants in San Jose, California
Economy of the Southwestern United States
Regional restaurant chains in the United States
Fast-food chains of the United States
Restaurants established in 1983
Vietnamese restaurants in the United States
Vietnamese-American culture in California
1983 establishments in California
Bakery cafés
Bakeries of California
Companies based in San Jose, California
American companies established in 1983